The Driving America Forward Act is legislation introduced in the U.S. Senate and House in 2019 that extends the federal tax credit for electric vehicle purchases. The Senate bill was introduced on April 9, 2019 by Democratic Senators Debbie Stabenow and Gary Peters, and Republican Senators Lamar Alexander and Susan Collins. The House bill was introduced by Democratic Congressman Dan Kildee.

Background

Electric vehicle adoption in the United States 
According to the Edison Electric Institute, the trade association for investor-owned utility companies, there were over 1.27 million electric vehicles (EVs) on the roads in the United States as of June 2019. Sales of EVs have grown: total sales of EVs in the U.S. in 2018 were 81 percent higher than in 2017. Around 85,000 EVs were purchase in the U.S. between April and June 2019.

Electric vehicle tax credit history 
To spur growth in the adoption of electric vehicles by U.S. consumers, in 2008 Congress created the electric vehicle tax credit by passing the Energy Improvement and Extension Act of 2008, which President George W. Bush signed. The new law created the "Qualified Plug-In Electric Drive Motor Vehicle Credit," the formal name for the electric vehicle tax credit.

The following year, President Barack Obama's economic stimulus bill (the American Recovery and Reinvestment Act of 2009) extended the life of the tax credit to people who bought their electric vehicles after 2009.

Congress structured the law in a way that phases out the tax credit for each automobile manufacturer once they sell 200,000 qualifying electric vehicles. Many top sellers, such as General Motors and Tesla, will soon reach or have already reached that cap.

Fraud potential 
In October 2019, the Treasury Inspector General for Tax Administration released a report of an audit it had conducted. In its audit, the agency found that "millions of dollars in potentially erroneous plug-in tax credits are being claimed for ineligible vehicles on income tax returns—to the tune of $82 million from tax years 2013 through 2017."

Legislative details 
The legislation extends two specific tax credits: electric vehicle purchases and hydrogen fuel-cell vehicle purchases.

Under the bill, when people buy qualifying electric vehicles or hydrogen fuel-cell vehicles, they get a dollar-for-dollar reduction in their federal tax liability (taxes owed for that year). For example, if someone's federal income tax is $7,500 for the year, and they purchase an electric vehicle that qualifies for a $7,500 tax credit, that person would not owe anything in federal taxes for that year.

Electric vehicles 
Under current law, the first 200,000 electric vehicles manufactured by each automaker come with a $7,500 tax credit to the consumers who buy them. The Driving America Forward Act would allow an additional 400,000 EVs to come with a tax credit (slightly less, at $7,000 per vehicle). Unless the bill is signed into law, people who buy EVs from manufacturers who have already sold over 200,000 electric vehicles do not get the tax credit.

When the original bill in 2007 that created the tax credit was being considered, Senator Orrin Hatch (R-UT), a sponsor of the bill, said that the tax credits were intended to be temporary as a means of “get[ting] these products over the initial stage of production.”

Hydrogen fuel-cell vehicles 
The bill also has a provision that extends a tax credit specifically for hydrogen fuel-cell vehicles through the year 2028.

Cost 
The bill's estimated cost to the federal government is $11.4 billion. This cost is calculated as a loss in tax revenues that the federal government would otherwise receive if the tax credits were not extended.

Cosponsors 
The Senate bill (S. 1094) is sponsored by Sen. Debbie Stabenow (D-MI). The Senate bill is bipartisan and includes both Democratic and Republican cosponsors. Cosponsors as of November 21, 2019 are:

 Lamar Alexander (R-TN)
 Gary Peters (D-MI)
 Susan Collins (R-ME)
 Angus King (I-ME) 
 Catherine Cortez Masto (D-NV) 
 Margaret Wood Hassan (D-NH)
 Patrick Leahy (D-VT)

The House bill (H.R. 2256) is sponsored by Rep. Daniel Kildee (D-MI). There are 131 cosponsors in the House as of November 21, 2019. All 131 cosponsors are from the Democratic Party; no Republican members have cosponsored this bill in the House.

Legislative history 
The official title of the bill is "A bill to amend the Internal Revenue Code of 1986 to modify limitations on the credit for plug-in electric drive motor vehicles, and for other purposes."

The Senate bill (S. 1094) was introduced on April 9, 2019.

The bill's prognosis for passage is a "3% chance of being enacted according to Skopos Labs."

Support and opposition 

Source:

Support 
Both GM and Tesla support the legislation and have hired lobbying firms to help push for passage of the bill.

Other automobile manufacturers, automotive trade associations, Alliance of Automobile Manufacturers, the Association of Global Automakers, electric utility companies, and pro-environment advocacy groups have come out in support of the bill.

Supporters of the bill in Congress, as of spring of 2019, were planning to attach the bill to a larger tax reform bill that they had hoped would be considered for debate.

Opposition 
One of the key opponents to the Driving America Forward Act is U.S. Senator John Barrasso, a Republican from Wyoming. In October 2018, Barrasso attempted to stop the bill and instead replace it with a tax on electric vehicles that would go toward road repair projects.

Another major opponent is the Trump Administration, which in March 2019 announced it wanted to eliminate the entire $7,500 tax credit. The reason the administration gave was that it would save the U.S. government $2.5 billion.

See also 

 Hybrid electric vehicle
 History of the electric vehicle

References

External links
U.S. Department of Energy - official list of eligible vehicles
Electric Drive Transportation Association
IRS Form 8936: Qualified Plug-in Electric Drive Motor Vehicle Credit
Plug-In Electric Drive Vehicle Credit (IRC 30D) - Internal Revenue Service
EVSE Rebates and Tax Credits, by State

Electric cars
Electric vehicle industry
Fuel cell vehicles
Proposed legislation of the 116th United States Congress